Honorary citizen is an honour  bestowed by South Korea's Minister of Justice on foreigners of exceptional merit. It is a symbolic honour; the recipient does not take the Oath of Citizenship and thus does not receive any rights, privileges, or duties typically held by a citizen of South Korea.

It is not to be confused with special naturalisation under Article 7 of the Nationality Act, under which the recipient actually becomes a citizen of South Korea. Such special naturalisation has for example been granted by the Minister of Justice to Martine Prost for her contribution on returning  from France.

The regulations governing grants of honorary citizenship are found in Article 22 of the Nationality Administrative Processing Directions. Paragraph 1 provides the criteria: foreigners may be granted honorary citizenship if they have received an order, decoration, or medal from the South Korean government; in recognition of contributions in the fields of security, society, economy, or the arts; or for other contribution at a level similar to the two previously mentioned. Paragraph 3 provides that an honorary citizen of South Korea can enjoy special immigration privileges under ordinances from the Minister of Justice.

As of June 2018, four people have been granted honorary citizenship of South Korea.

References

South Korea
South Korean nationality law
South Korean awards